Donje Ledenice  (Cyrillic: Доње Леденице) is a village in the municipalities of Pelagićevo (Republika Srpska) and Gradačac, Bosnia and Herzegovina.

Demographics 
According to the 2013 census, its population was 652, with 48 of them living in the Pelagićevo part and 604 in the Gradačac part.

References

Populated places in Gradačac
Populated places in Pelagićevo